Mendykara is a district of Kostanay Region in northern Kazakhstan. The administrative center of the district is the selo of Borovskoy. Population:

References

External links

Districts of Kazakhstan
Kostanay Region